The 1948 St. Louis Browns season involved the Browns finishing 6th in the American League with a record of 59 wins and 94 losses. It was the first Browns baseball season to be telecast on local television, having debuted its game broadcasts that year on KSD with Bob Ingham on the commentary box as the play by play announcer, nearly a year after other MLB teams made their television debuts.

Offseason 
 November 24, 1947: Ed Albrecht was drafted by the Browns from the New York Giants in the 1947 minor league draft.
 December 9, 1947: Johnny Berardino was traded by the Browns to the Cleveland Indians for Catfish Metkovich and $50,000.

Regular season

Season standings

Record vs. opponents

Notable transactions 
 April 20, 1948: The Browns returned Catfish Metkovich to the Cleveland Indians to complete the deal made on December 9, 1947. The Cleveland Indians also sent $15,000 to the Browns to complete the trade. (Date given is approximate. Exact date is uncertain.)
 June 4, 1948: Ray Coleman was traded by the Browns to the Philadelphia Athletics for George Binks and $20,000.
 June 15, 1948: Sam Zoldak was traded by the Browns to the Cleveland Indians for Bill Kennedy and $100,000.

Roster

Player stats

Batting

Starters by position 
Note: Pos = Position; G = Games played; AB = At bats; H = Hits; Avg. = Batting average; HR = Home runs; RBI = Runs batted in

Other batters 
Note: G = Games played; AB = At bats; H = Hits; Avg. = Batting average; HR = Home runs; RBI = Runs batted in

Pitching

Starting pitchers 
Note: G = Games pitched; IP = Innings pitched; W = Wins; L = Losses; ERA = Earned run average; SO = Strikeouts

Other pitchers 
Note: G = Games pitched; IP = Innings pitched; W = Wins; L = Losses; ERA = Earned run average; SO = Strikeouts

Relief pitchers 
Note: G = Games pitched; W = Wins; L = Losses; SV = Saves; ERA = Earned run average; SO = Strikeouts

Farm system 

LEAGUE CHAMPIONS: Port Chester, Globe-Miami

References

External links
1948 St. Louis Browns team at Baseball-Reference
1948 St. Louis Browns season at baseball-almanac.com

St. Louis Browns seasons
Saint Louis Browns season
St. Louis Browns